Ira Anders (born April 15, 1942) is an American Democratic politician. He is a former member of the Missouri House of Representatives from the 21st District, being first elected in 2010 and having served to January 2019.

References

1942 births
21st-century American politicians
Emporia State University alumni
Living people
Democratic Party members of the Missouri House of Representatives
People from Marion County, Kansas